No. 38 Group RAF was a group of the Royal Air Force which disbanded on 31 December 2020. It was formed on 6 November 1943 from the former 38 Wing with nine squadrons as part of Transport Command. It was disbanded on 31 January 1951, but re-formed on 1 January 1960, became part of RAF Air Support Command in 1967 and then, in 1972, the air support group within RAF Strike Command. It was temporarily disbanded from 18 Nov 1983 to 31 Oct 1992 and from 1 April 2000 to 1 July 2014. It subsequently became part of RAF Air Command, bringing together the Royal Air Force’s Engineering, Logistics, Communications and Medical Operations units. Air Officer Commanding No. 38 Group was also responsible for UK-based United States Visiting Forces (USVF) units and for RAF personnel attached to other global armed forces.

History
The predecessor of 38 Group was No. 38 Wing RAF, initially formed on 15 January 1942 from 296 and 297 Squadrons and based at RAF Netheravon in Wiltshire under Group Captain Sir Nigel Norman. 295 Squadron was additionally formed at Netheravon on 3 August 1942. To these were added 570, 298, 299, 190, 196, 620 Squadrons to form No. 38 Group on 11 October 1943. At that time four squadrons were equipped with Albemarles (295, 296, 297, 570), one with Halifaxes (298) and four with Stirlings (299, 190, 196, 620). A further Halifax unit, 644 Squadron, was added in February 1944.

During 1943, changes of all aircraft types and operational bases were made. Nevertheless 295, 296 and 297 Squadrons were heavily involved that year in operations Beggar, Ladbroke and Fustian, during the invasion of Sicily. From February 1944 many sorties were made over mainland Europe in support of Special Operations Executive and detachments of the Special Air Service.

But by 5 June 1944 the group’s updated resources had been fully redeployed between RAF Brize Norton, RAF Fairford, RAF Harwell, RAF Keevil and RAF Tarrant Rushton in preparation for Operation Overlord, the invasion of Europe. From then to 16 June the Group was fully involved in operations Tonga (the delivery of paratroop-filled gliders at the onset of Overlord) and Mallard (the delivery of the main airborne forces and their equipment by glider).

In September 1944 the group was called upon to ferry airborne troops for Operation Market Garden, the abortive attempt to capture the Rhine bridge at Arnhem. Following that operation there was further reorganisation; the Group Headquarters moved to Marks Hall, Essex in October 1944 and the squadrons were redeployed to RAF Earls Colne (296 and 297), RAF Rivenhall (295 and 570), RAF Great Dunmow (190 and 620), RAF Wethersfield (later to RAF Shepherds Grove) (196 and 299) and RAF Woodbridge (298 and 644). 190 Squadron remained temporarily at RAF Fairford. On 10 March 1945 161 Squadron at RAF Tempsford also came under 38 Group control.

On 24 March 1945 the squadrons were fully employed in delivering airborne troops to the far bank of the Rhine as part of Operation Varsity, an operation which proved costly in terms of aircrew lives lost.

After the war most 38 Group squadrons were either disbanded or relocated to the Far East and the HQ moved to RAF Upavon. 295 and 297 Squadrons merged and moved to Fairford. 38 Group became part of RAF Transport Command on 1 June 1945.

In 1972, Headquarters 38 Group moved from RAF Odiham, Hants, where it had been since 1960, to RAF Benson, Oxon. Also that year, on 1 July 1972, it became part of the new RAF Strike Command. No. 46 Group RAF was merged into 38 Group on 1 January 1976. On 17 November 1983, 38 Group was subsumed within Headquarters No. 1 Group RAF at RAF Upavon in Wiltshire. 

38 Group was again active during the 1990s from 1992 to 2000. 

From 2014, the reformed group had units at RAF Wittering, RAF Brize Norton, RAF High Wycombe and RAF Leeming. The reformed group now includes RAF A4 Force Elements (deployable engineering and logistic units),  Tactical Medical Wing at Brize Norton, and  Tactical Communications Wing RAF at RAF Leeming. On 1 April 2015 38 Group assumed responsibility for the Royal Air Force Mountain Rescue Service (MRS) with its three teams at RAF Lossiemouth, RAF Leeming and RAF Valley where it is co-located with the MRS Headquarters.

38 Group was disbanded on 31 December 2020, with the units under its command dispersed to other groups and areas of the RAF, including the newly formed integrated Support Force.

Orders of battle

1944

1945

1962

1982

2016 
Order of Battle for No. 38 Group RAF, December 2016

Commanding officers

38 Wing

38 Group

See also
 List of Royal Air Force groups
 List of Royal Air Force aircraft squadrons

References

Notes

Bibliography

 Delve, Ken. The Source Book of the RAF. Shrewsbury, Shropshire, UK: Airlife Publishing, 1994. .

External links
 Group history on RAF 38 Group website
 No 38 Group
 Air of Authority - A History of RAF Organisation
 Arnhem forces

038
Transport units and formations of the Royal Air Force
Military units and formations established in 1943